The  2013 Campeonato Argentino de Rugby , the maximum rugby union interprovincial tournament in Argentina, and older national tournament was played between 2 and 30 November.
The tournament return to be played at the end of the year. As usual the teams were divided in 3 division : "Campeonato", "Ascenso", "Desarollo"

Eight teams divided in two poola, with the first two of the pool to semifinals, and the other two the two triangulars ("permanence") with the winner of the two pools of "Ascenso", to determine relegation for 2014 championship

Campeonato

Pool 1

Pool 2

Semifinals

Final

Ascenso

Pool 3

Pool 4

Promotion triangular

Pool A

Pool B

Play Out 

 Oeste relegated to third division 2014

"Estimulo"

First Phase

Pool 1

Pool 1

Pool 3

Final Phase

"Copa de oro"

"Copa de Plata"

"Copa de Bronce"

External links and bibliography 
  Francesco Volpe, Paolo Pacitti (Author), Rugby 2014, GTE Gruppo Editorale (2013)
  Torneo en UAR.com.ar
  Reglamento de las Zonas Campeonato y Zona Ascenso en formato pdf
  Reglamento de las Zona Estímulo en formato pdf

Campeonato Argentino de Rugby
Campeonato
Campeonato